Rugby Championship may refer to:

Men's international
The Rugby Championship, an annual international rugby union competition organised by SANZAAR for teams in the southern hemisphere
Americas Rugby Championship, an international rugby union competition organised by the IRB for teams in North and South America
South American Rugby Championship, an annual international rugby union competition for teams in South America
Regional Rugby Championship, an annual international club rugby union featuring some European sides
United Rugby Championship, an annual international club rugby union featuring some European and South African sides
Asian Rugby Championship, an annual international rugby union competition for teams in Asia

Women's international
NACRA Women's Rugby Championship, an international women's rugby union competition for teams in the Caribbean
Caribbean Women's Rugby Championship, a former international women's rugby union competition organised by the IRB for teams in the Caribbean
ARFU Women's Rugby Championship, an international women's rugby union competition for teams in Asia

Domestic
Australian Rugby Championship, a former domestic rugby union competition in Australia
Canadian Rugby Championship, an annual domestic rugby union competition in Canada
RFU Championship, a second tier of professional rugby union in England
Rugby Championship of Yugoslavia, an annual domestic rugby union competition in the former Yugoslavia
Norway Rugby Championship, an annual domestic rugby union competition in Norway
All Japan University Rugby Championship, an annual domestic rugby union competition involving Japanese universities
Rugby Championship of Serbia, an annual domestic rugby union competition in Serbia
Rugby Championship of Czechoslovakia, an annual domestic rugby union competition in the former Czechoslovakia
Campeonato Brasileiro de Rugby, an annual domestic rugby union competition in Brazil

Wheelchair
World Wheelchair Rugby Championships, an international wheelchair rugby competition organised by the IWRF